The 19309 / 19310 Shanti Express is a daily express train offered by Western Railways in India. The name Shanti means 'peace' which reflects the peace messages given by the father of the nation Mahatma Gandhi.

Coach composition

The train consists of 18 coaches :

 1 AC First Class
 1 AC II Tier
 1 AC III Tier
 9 Sleeper Class
 4 General Unreserved
 2 Seating cum Luggage Rake

Service

The 19309/Shanti Express has an average speed of 47 km/hr and covers 570 km in 12 hrs 10 mins.

The 19310/Shanti Express has an average speed of 51 km/hr and covers 570 km in 11 hrs 15 mins.

Route & halts

The important halts of the train are :

 
 
 
 
 
 
 
 
 
 
 
  (for )

Schedule

Traction

Both trains are hauled by a Vadodara Electric Loco Shed-based WAP-5 electric locomotives on its entire journey.

See also

 Ahilyanagari Express
 Avantika Express
 Malwa Express

References

Named passenger trains of India
Transport in Indore
Rail transport in Madhya Pradesh
Rail transport in Gujarat
Transport in Gandhinagar
Railway services introduced in 2004
Express trains in India